Bodaki refers to the following places in Poland:

 Bodaki, Lesser Poland Voivodeship
 Bodaki, Podlaskie Voivodeship